Icatibant, sold under the brand name Firazyr, is a medication for the symptomatic treatment of acute attacks of hereditary angioedema (HAE) in adults with C1-esterase-inhibitor deficiency. It is not effective in angioedema caused by medication from the ACE inhibitor class.

It is a peptidomimetic consisting of ten amino acids, which is a selective and specific antagonist of bradykinin B2 receptors.

Mechanism of action
Bradykinin is a peptide-based hormone that is formed locally in tissues, very often in response to a trauma. It increases vessel permeability, dilates blood vessels and causes smooth muscle cells to contract. Bradykinin plays an important role as the mediator of pain. Surplus bradykinin is responsible for the typical symptoms of inflammation, such as swelling, redness, overheating and pain. These symptoms are mediated by activation of bradykinin B2 receptors. Icatibant acts as a bradykinin inhibitor by blocking the binding of native bradykinin to the bradykinin B2 receptor. Little is known about the effects of icatibant on the bradykinin B1 receptor.

Society and culture

Legal status 
Icatibant received orphan drug status in Australia, the EU, Switzerland, and the US for the treatment of hereditary angioedema (HAE).

In the EU, the approval by the European Commission (July 2008) allows Jerini to market Firazyr in the European Union's 27 member states, as well as Switzerland, Liechtenstein and Iceland, making it the first product to be approved in all EU countries for the treatment of HAE. In the US, the drug was granted FDA approval on August 25, 2011.

References

External links 
 
 

Anti-inflammatory agents
Peptides
Orphan drugs
Takeda Pharmaceutical Company brands